Joe Torre: Curveballs Along the Way is a 1997 television film chronicling Joe Torre's first year as manager of the New York Yankees when they won the World Series in 1996.  It stars Paul Sorvino as Joe Torre. The film aired on October 17, 1997, on Showtime.

Plot
During the 1996 baseball season, Joe Torre, manager of the New York Yankees, not only needs to concentrate on his team, but also the needs of his brother Frank, who is in need of a heart transplant, facing the same condition that already took the life of their other brother.

Cast
 Paul Sorvino as Joe Torre
 Robert Loggia as Frank Torre
 Isaiah Washington as Dwight Gooden
 Dean McDermott as David Cone
 Gailard Sartain as Don Zimmer
 Barbara Williams as Ali Torre

References

1997 films
1997 television films
1990s biographical films
1990s sports films
American baseball films
Biographical films about sportspeople
Sports films based on actual events
Films about the New York Yankees
Showtime (TV network) films
Cultural depictions of baseball players
1990s English-language films
1990s American films